Stanislav Klobása (born 7 March 1994) is a professional Czech football forward who plays for FC Vysočina Jihlava.

References

External links 
 

1994 births
Living people
Czech First League players
FK Mladá Boleslav players
FC Sellier & Bellot Vlašim players
FK Varnsdorf players
FC Vysočina Jihlava players
Czech footballers
Czech Republic youth international footballers
Czech Republic under-21 international footballers
Association football forwards
People from Brandýs nad Labem-Stará Boleslav
Czech National Football League players
Sportspeople from the Central Bohemian Region